The Prince of Broadway is a 1926 American silent drama film directed by John Gorman and starring George Walsh, Alyce Mills, and Freeman Wood.

Plot
As described in a film magazine review, middleweight boxing champion George Burke leads a convivial life and his careless living results in him being knocked out in a match. Actress Nancy Lee, who was his boyhood sweetheart, persuades her wealthy lover Wade Turner to let George use his California ranch to rehabilitate and train. Turner does so but notifies his foreman to hinder George from getting into fighting shape. George, however, rounds back into shape under the care of and training by James J. Jeffries. Wade and Nancy arrive, the former having told her that George is not making good with his time at the ranch. However, George is able to best the champion and wins the love of Nancy.

Cast

References

Bibliography
 Munden, Kenneth White. The American Film Institute Catalog of Motion Pictures Produced in the United States, Part 1. University of California Press, 1997.

External links

1926 films
1926 drama films
Silent American drama films
Films directed by John Gorman
American silent feature films
1920s English-language films
American black-and-white films
1920s American films